Friedrich Schulz (1897–1976) was a German general.

Friedrich Schulz, Friedrich Schultz, Friedrich Schulze, or Friedrich Schultze may also refer to:

 Friedrich August Schulze (1770–1849), German novelist
 Friedrich Wilhelm Schulz (1797–1860), German radical-democratic publisher
 Friedrich Eduard Schulz (1799–1829), German orientalist and philosopher
 Friedrich Wilhelm Schultz (1804–1876), German pharmacist and botanist
 Friedrich Schulze (1843–1912), German architect
 Friedrich Schultze (1848–1934), German neurologist